Hüseyin-Ali Pala (born 9 April 1990) is a Turkish-German footballer who plays for Bayburt İdarespor.

External links

1990 births
Living people
German footballers
German people of Turkish descent
VfB Stuttgart II players
Stuttgarter Kickers players
SG Sonnenhof Großaspach players
3. Liga players
Association football forwards
People from Backnang
Sportspeople from Stuttgart (region)
Footballers from Baden-Württemberg